Stern Noel Liffa (born 17 July 2000) is a Malawian athlete. He competed in the men's 100 metres event at the 2019 World Athletics Championships. He competed in the preliminary round and he did not advance to compete in the heats.

References

External links

2000 births
Living people
Malawian male sprinters
Place of birth missing (living people)
World Athletics Championships athletes for Malawi
Athletes (track and field) at the 2019 African Games
African Games competitors for Malawi
Athletes (track and field) at the 2022 Commonwealth Games